is a collection of various short manga series by Hiroki Endo spanning two tankōbon volumes.

Development
In the play in "For Those of Us Who Don't Believe in God", the story of American serial killer Henry Lee Lucas is recounted. It is evident that Hiroki Endo put effort into his research of the man, as a short bibliography is listed within the manga itself. It's implied that Lucas was the basis for the killer character within the play.

Volume 1

Originally published in 1996 in Monthly Afternoon.
 A lone yakuza member takes refuge from a gang war with a young woman who seems to have formed a strange relationship with crows. During his time with her, he comes to reconsider the course of his own life.

Originally published in 1996 in Monthly Afternoon.
A girl's bewilderment over sex is overloaded by her widower father's decision to take a lover, driving her to a sudden swing from passive indifference to reactionary violence.

Originally published in 1997 in Monthly Afternoon.
Centers around a group of college drama students preparing and performing a play depicting a conversation between a serial killer and the sister of one of his victims. The process causes the group to reflect and ultimately confront their own individual problems.

Volume 2

"Hang"
Originally published in 2000 in Afternoon Season Special Edition.

Originally published in 1999 in Afternoon Season Special Edition.
A semi-autobiographical story featuring Hiroki Endo being distracted from doing work.

Originally published in 1996 in Monthly Afternoon.

Newly written for this volume.

References

Further reading

External links
 Tanpenshu Vol. 1 at Dark Horse Comics
 

Dark Horse Comics titles
Drama anime and manga
Kodansha manga
Psychological anime and manga
Seinen manga